Olha Pavlovna Aivazovska (born 9 February 1981 in Zalishchyky Raion, Ternopil Oblast), is a Ukrainian civil society activist. As a member and chair of the board of the non-governmental organisation OPORA, she was and is primarily responsible for monitoring elections, ensuring freedom and fairness. She also aided in negotiation on the Ukrainian side in the Trilateral Contact Group on the settlement of the military conflict in the Donbas from 2016 to 2018.

Life

Education 
Aivazovska initially studied Ukrainian philology/anthropology and journalism at the National Bohdan Khmelnytskyi University in Cherkasy. In 2016, she completed the Democracy and Human Rights Programme at the Center in democracy, development and the rule of law (CDDRL) at Stanford University in California as part of a Draper Hills Summer Fellowship that she was selected for. From 2020 onwards, she studied law at the Graduate Institute of the Taras Shevchenko National University in Kyiv.

Leadership training 
Aivazovska has participated in many leadership training programmes, including at the Aspen Institute in Kyiv and the Ukrainian School of Political Studies. The Ukrainian School of Political Studies is a joint project of the Legislative Initiatives Laboratory and the Council of Europe. It was launched in 2005 on the occasion of the 10th anniversary of Ukraine's accession to the Council of Europe. The USPS aims to educate and network in hopes of creating a culture of public policy in Ukraine committed to the principles of fairness, trust and dialogue.

Election monitoring and political activity 
Since 2001, Aivazovska has been involved in monitoring elections in Ukraine to ensure their validity. From 2000 to 2004, she was head of the regional public youth organisation "Young Enlightenment" in Cherkasy. In 2006, she became a member of the all-Ukrainian non-governmental organisation OPORA. Since 2007 she has been editor-in-chief of the all-Ukrainian daily newspaper "OPORA's Point" and in 2009 she ascended to the role of chairperson of OPORA's board of directors. She remains in this position as of 2022. Aivazovska led the election monitoring with roughly 25,000 activists in Ukraine and also participated in election monitoring in more than 10 distinct European countries. According to the Ukrainian magazine Fokus, Aivazovska was on the list of the 100 most powerful women in Ukraine from 2014 to 2020 due to her position in political and social life.

Since 2018 she has been a member of the board of the International Renaissance Foundation. As chair of the board, she coordinates the OPORA network's political programmes in 89 countries and 9 regional members in Africa, Asia, Europe, Latin America and the Caribbean, the Middle East and Africa. The organisations form this global network through non-partisan, community-based election observation activities to ensure the integrity of  electoral processes, strengthen the accountability and provide scrutiny toward governments and political parties, reduce the potential for politically motivated violence and strengthen people's right to participate in government.

Aivazovska observed the party landscape and found that there are 370 disparate political parties in Ukraine in 2021. Compared to other European countries, Ukraine is fairly average in its saturation of parties. Aivazovska is also critical of the fact that parties are also misused for manipulative purposes. With exhibitions, speeches and interviews, she tries to engage in the democratic education of the population.

Trilateral Contact Group (Minsk) 
From 2016 to 2018, Aivazovska aided in negotiations on the settlement of the military conflict in the Donbas as an expert on the Ukrainian side in the Trilateral Contact Group in Minsk.

References

External links 

 
 INTERIM REPORT on the Findings of Civic Network OPORA's Long-term Election Observation of the October 31 Local Elections for the period of October 10 – 28, 2010. Retrieved 28 February 2022 .

Bibliography 

1981 births
Living people
21st-century Ukrainian politicians
People from Ternopil Oblast
Ukrainian activists